Admiral Sir Henry D'Esterre Darby,  (9 April 1749 – 30 March 1823) was an officer in the Royal Navy. He was the third son of Jonathan and Susannah Darby of Leap Castle, in King's County, Ireland. He was the nephew of Vice Admiral George Darby. Darby first went to sea when he was thirteen but it was another fourteen years before he made lieutenant, aboard his uncle's ship . In 1781, he was given command of the 8-gun Infernal but was captured after an inconclusive action at the Battle of Porto Praya and remained a prisoner for the rest of the war.

He was promoted to Captain in 1783 and had command of HMS Bellerophon at the Battle of the Nile in 1798.

A letter to Darby from Admiral Nelson, commander of the fleet at the battle, survives:

Darby was promoted to Rear Admiral of the Blue in 1804; Rear Admiral of the White in 1805; Rear Admiral of the Red in 1808; Vice Admiral of the Blue in 1810; Vice Admiral of the White in 1811; Vice Admiral of the Red in 1814; Admiral of the Blue in 1819.  He was appointed Knight Commander of the Order of the Bath in 1820.

Citations

References
Cordingly, David. (2003). The Billy Ruffian: The Bellerophon and the Downfall of Napoleon. Bloomsbury USA.

 Access to Archives: Darby family of London, Warbleton and Leap Castle

1750 births
1823 deaths
Royal Navy admirals
British naval commanders of the Napoleonic Wars
Knights Commander of the Order of the Bath